Laura is a 1955 American TV film for The 20th Century-Fox Hour. It was a remake of the 1944 film of the same name.

It was adapted by Mel Dinelli, produced by Otto Lang and directed by John Brahm.

Stack was assigned to star as he was under contract to Fox. He said Brahm "who had not asked for the idiotic assignment, got so tangled up in the cameras and the seven day schedule it took us fourteen days to shoot it."

Sanders and Stack reprised their roles in a 1968 TV film version which Stack called "an even worse version of the poor defenseless film".

Plot summary

Cast
 George Sanders as Waldo Lydecker
 Dana Wynter as Laura Hunt
 Robert Stack as Mark McPherson
 Scott Forbes as Shelby Carpenter
 Johnny Washbrook as Danny Morgan 
 Gloria Clark as Bessie Clary 
 Gordon Wynn as MacAvity 
 Robert B. Williams as Fred Callahan 
 Harry Carter as Policeman

References

External links
 Laura at BFI
 Laura at IMDb

1955 television films
1955 films
American television films